The city of Vancouver, located in British Columbia, Canada, has a moderate oceanic climate (Köppen climate classification Cfb) that borders on a warm-summer Mediterranean climate (Csb). Its summer months are typically dry, often resulting in moderate drought conditions, usually in July and August. In contrast, the rest of the year is rainy, especially between October and March.

Like the rest of the British Columbia Coast, the city is tempered by the North Pacific Current, which has its origins in the milder Kuroshio Current and is also, to an extent, sheltered by the mountains of Vancouver Island to the west.

General conditions
The climatology of Vancouver applies to the entire Greater Vancouver region and not just to the City of Vancouver itself. While Vancouver's coastal location serves to moderate its temperatures, sea breezes and mountainous terrain make Greater Vancouver a region of microclimates, with local variations in weather sometimes being more exaggerated than those experienced in other coastal areas.

Predicting precipitation in the Greater Vancouver area is particularly complex. Snow is problematic for meteorologists to predict due to temperatures remaining close to freezing during snow events.

Temperatures
This is one of the warmest in Canada. Greater Vancouver is in USDA plant hardiness zone 8, similar to other coastal or near-coastal cities such as Seattle, Portland, Amsterdam, and London, as well as places such as Atlanta, Georgia and Raleigh, North Carolina, far to the south (though these locations have far more growing degree days due to their much warmer summers). The semi-mild climate sustains plants such as the Windmill Palm. Vancouver's growing season averages 221 days, from March 29 until November 5. This is 72 days longer than Toronto's, and longer than any other major urban centre in Canada.

Despite normally semi-mild winters due to the onshore air flow over the North Pacific Current, occasional cold squamish or Arctic outflow (sinking cold continental air that flows down through the Fraser Valley coastward) in winter can sometimes last a week or more. These Arctic outflows occur on average one to three times per winter. The coldest temperature across Metro Vancouver, however, is  recorded in Pitt Meadows on January 23, 1969.

With snow being an infrequent occurrence over a typically mild winter, many cold hardy flowers remain in bloom and are common in gardens and office exteriors throughout the winter. The arrival of spring is often first noticed in February with slightly milder temperatures and the return of flowering perennials. It's also not uncommon for cherry trees to begin blooming later in the month, as was seen prominently during the 2010 Winter Olympics.

Conversely, winter temperatures tend to be cooler inland by a couple of degrees.

Daylight
The relatively high latitude of 49° 15′ 0″ N (similar to Paris, France, at 48° 85′ 66″) means sunsets as early as 4:15 pm and sunrises as late as 8:10 am. From November to February, at the sunshine measuring station at the airport in Richmond, on average more than 70% of the already short daytime is completely cloudy. The percentage of cloudiness is higher in Vancouver and especially the North Shore because upslope winds going up the mountainsides lead to the development of clouds.

Summers, in contrast, are characterized by a nearly opposite weather pattern, with consistent high pressure and sunshine. July and August are the sunniest months. Near the summer solstice, there are less than 8 hours between sunset and sunrise, with twilight lasting past 10 pm.

Statistics

Vancouver International Airport

1981–2010 normals

1971–2000 normals

1961–1990 normals

1951–1980 normals

1941–1970 normals

Vancouver Harbour

1971–2000 normals

1951–1980 normals

Oakridge

Precipitation

Rain

Vancouver is Canada's third most rainy city, with over 161 rainy days per year. As measured at Vancouver Airport in Richmond, Vancouver receives  of rain per year.

Thunderstorms are rare, with an average of 6.1 thunderstorm days per year. The weather in spring and autumn is usually showery and cool.

The grass-cutting season often begins in March and continues through October. Summers can be quite dry, and, as such, grass that has not been watered may not need to be cut for a month or even longer. Some summers may have no rain for five weeks or more, while others might have several very wet days in a row. In addition, Vancouver is one of the driest cities in Canada during the summer season, but the rest of the year the high pressure that locks in during the summer moves out and is replaced by the usual low pressure systems (rainy weather) by fall through to mid-spring.

July is historically the driest month in Vancouver and, in fact, Vancouver International Airport recorded no rainfall at all during the whole month of July 2013; the first time ever in recorded history.

Snow

Snow falls in the higher-lying areas of Greater Vancouver, such as Burnaby Mountain, Coquitlam, and North and West Vancouver, every winter. It is also common in places close to or at sea level, however in lesser amounts. There is a general misconception among visitors and residents of other parts of Canada that Vancouver does not receive any snow at all, but in fact there has never been a year in which traceable snow has not been observed at Vancouver International Airport. The year 2015 marked an entire year of no measurable snow; only a trace was recorded on December 17, 2015. Environment Canada has ranked Vancouver in 3rd place under the category of "lowest snowfall" among 100 major Canadian cities as the annual average of days with snowfall above  is only at 8.7 days. Vancouver's coastal climate has nonetheless allowed it to be ranked in 59th place under the category of "Most huge snowfall days (25 cm or more)", placing it above cities like Calgary and Toronto as Vancouver averages 0.13 days annually with snowfall accumulations above  (within a calendar day).

Snow in Vancouver tends to be quite wet, which, combined with typical winter temperatures rising above and falling below  throughout the course of the day, can make for icy road conditions.

Years or months with snowfall surpassing  are not completely exceptional.

However, even small amounts of snow in the Vancouver area can cause school closures, as well as produce traffic problems. The low frequency of snowfall makes it hard to justify the public works infrastructure necessary for more effective snow removal, as the city is usually in a thaw situation long before plowing of streets are completed. The City budgets $400,000 per year for the maintenance of snow removal equipment, for the purchasing of de-icing salt, and for the training of staff, but the costs of actual snow removal are funded separately from contingency reserve funds, and vary widely from season to season. For example, $1.1 million was spent in 1998, compared to $0 in 2001. Blizzards are extremely rare, but heavy snowfall events are more common.

According to Environment and Climate Change Canada (2011), Vancouver now has a 20% chance of a White Christmas (up from 11%). Snow was also present for Christmas 2007, when  was measured at the Vancouver International Airport. Despite higher frequency of snow during certain periods of the season (pattern unknown), generally, annual winter snowfall has decreased over the last 20 years.

Severe weather

Gales are unlikely during the autumn months in Greater Vancouver. Three wind storms in the city's history have knocked down large swathes of trees in the forest of Stanley Park, the first having occurred in October 1934, with a blizzard the following January compounding its impact. The second wind storm to hit Stanley Park was the remnant of Typhoon Freda in 1962 that levelled a  tract of forest. This is now site of the park's miniature railroad.

2006 storms

In November 2006, the Greater Vancouver region experienced above-average levels of rainfall and snowfall, breaking the previously established record of  when  of rain fell within the first 16 days of the month. The heavy rain washed sediment into the city's reservoirs, and, as result, many businesses were advised to stop serving beverages prepared from tap water due to water contamination.

At Vancouver International Airport,  of snow was recorded from the night of November 25 to the morning of November 27. On November 29,  more snow fell on the city. The snowfall resulted in the closure of a number of public institutions and caused power outages throughout Surrey and Langley.

In Stanley Park, it damaged or uprooted over 5,000 trees, and caused mudslides, one of which destroyed a section of the seawall. Insured damages throughout the province were expected to reach CA$40 million and repairs to Stanley Park were expected to cost $9 million.

Notes

References

Geography of Vancouver
Vancouver